The  Kutaisi synagogue  is one of three synagogues in Kutaisi in the Republic of Georgia.

History

The synagogue was built in 1885 and it is located at the Gaponov Street 57–59. The other synagogues, located at Gaponov Street 8 and Gaponov Street 10, are 160 years old.

References 

Synagogues in Georgia (country)
Orthodox synagogues
Buildings and structures in Kutaisi
Synagogues completed in 1885